The following is a partial list of Turkish Air Force bases and airfields, past and present.

Major active-duty installations
Until 2015 the combat formations of the Turkish Air Force were formed into two air forces (equal to air armies) - the 1st Air Force, covering the western part of the country, and the 2nd Air Force, covering the eastern part. The two have been merged into the Combat Air Force and Missile Air Defence Command (Muharip Hava Kuvveti ve Hava Füze Savunma Komutanlığı), headquartered at Eskişehir Air Base. The main air bases, which are tasked to regularly support full-spectrum operations, including those of the air combat squadrons are brigade equivalents called Main Jet Base Command (Ana Jet Üs Komutanlığı). The ground-based missile air defence squadrons are formed in Missile Base Command (Füze Üs Komutanlığı). The UAV units are centered around a Unmanned Aircraft Systems Main Base Command (İnsansız Uçak Sistemleri Ana Üs Komutanlığı) and the TAF's tanker aircraft around a Tanker Base Command (Tanker Üs Komutanlığı). The tactical air transport, VIP and MedEvac squadrons are formed into two Air Transport Main Base Command (Hava Ulaştırma Ana Üs Komutanlığı) subordinated to the Air Logistics Command, together with the second line maintenance and with the storage facilities of the TAF. Air training is centered around the Main Jet Base Flight Training Center Command (Ana Jet Üs Uçuş Eğitim Merkez Komutanlığı) under the Air Training Command. Current operational "major" active duty air bases and facilities, some with ICAO Airport Codes:

References

 
Turkish Air Force
Air Force